Aring Bautista (born 1920) was the stage name of a Filipino actress. Her real name was Aurea Navales. Bautista made her whole career doing movies under her film studio Sampaguita Pictures, and was the mother-in-law of Francisco Coching.

Filmography
 1951 - Batas ng Daigdig - Sampaguita Pictures
 1952 - Madam X - Sampaguita Pictures
 1952 - Mayamang Balo - Sampaguita Pictures
 1952 - Kasaysayan ni Roy Marcial - Sampaguita Pictures
 1953 - Cofradia (film) - Sampaguita Pictures
 1953 - Diwani - Sampaguita Pictures
 1953 - Maldita - Sampaguita Pictures
 1953 - Recuerdo  - Sampaguita Pictures
 1954 - Sabungera - Sampaguita Pictures
 1954 - MN - Sampaguita Pictures
 1954 - Luha ng Birhen - Sampaguita Pictures
 1954 - Dumagit - Sampaguita Pictures
 1955 - Bulaklak sa Parang  - Sampaguita Pictures
 1956 - Prince Charming - Sampaguita Pictures
 1956 - Teresa - Sampaguita Pictures
 1957 - Hongkong Holiday - Sampaguita Pictures
 1957 - Pretty Boy - Sampaguita Pictures
 1957 - Gabi at Araw - Sampaguita Pictures
 1957 - Veronica - Sampaguita Pictures
 1958 - Anino ni Bathala - Sampaguita Pictures
 1958 - Tatlong Ilaw sa Dambana - Sampaguita Pictures
 1958 - Tawag ng Tanghalan - Vera-Perez Pictures

References

External links
 

1920 births
Filipino film actresses
Year of death missing